Michael Dods (born Galashiels, 30 December 1968) was a Scottish rugby union player. He played as a wing and as a fullback.

He played for Gala and Northampton RFC.

He had 8 caps for Scotland, from 1994 to 1996, scoring 3 tries, 1 conversion and 21 penalties, an amazing aggregate of 80 points. He played 5 times at the Five Nations Championship, 1 in 1994 and 4 in 1996. In the 1996 Five Nations Championship, he scored 3 tries, 1 conversion and 10 penalties, 47 points in aggregate. He was the top try scorer in the competition, with 3 tries. 
His brother Peter Dods was also capped for Scotland.

References

 Bath, Richard (ed.) The Scotland Rugby Miscellany (Vision Sports Publishing Ltd, 2007 )

External links
Michael Dods International Statistics

1968 births
Living people
England international rugby sevens players
Rugby union fullbacks
Rugby union players from Galashiels
Rugby union wings
Scotland international rugby union players
Scottish rugby union players